Chefs vs. City is an American television show that aired on Food Network for two seasons from 2009 to 2010. The show stars chefs Aarón Sanchez and Chris Cosentino, who travel to different cities of the United States to challenge two local chefs to a variety of food-related challenges. The show was hosted by actor Ethan Erickson.

Show format 

Each episode takes place in a major United States city. The show features two teams: two Food Network chefs (Sanchez and Cosentino) and two chefs from the featured city. At the beginning of the show, each contestant receives a backpack with certain instruments that they will use during the contest, and a dossier with information on their first stop. Each team is given a Ford Expedition to move around the city as they try to reach each stop ahead of the other team.

At each stop, both teams have to complete a certain food-related task before they receive a new dossier and advance to the next contest. Examples of tasks include eating a whole serving of an extremely spicy or very large dish, sampling and separating products, and cooking or prepping dishes.

After the final contest, the contestants have to race through a finish line together to win.

Of the show's twenty episodes, Chris and Aaron won in 14 of them, and lost in six.

Changes from season 1 to 2 

During season 1, the competitors would have to run to the finish line. But, during season 2, they would drive to the finish line and then run. Also in season 2, the directions on the signs at the challenges got shorter.  The first five season 2 episodes featured Chris and Aaron against fellow Food Network stars, who acted as the "City" representatives.

Controversy
In 2014, Cosentino gave a talk at the MAD Symposium about how he regretted participating in the series. Most notably, he had gotten third-degree alkaline burns on his stomach lining as a result of the eating challenges, which he said took him five years to recover from, during which time he had to carefully monitor his diet. He also said that the show made him look "like a bully" when he and Sanchez beat the local chefs, and that the show's eating challenges glamorized overeating.

Season 1

Season 2

References

External links 
 
 Chefs vs. City @ imdb.com
 Eat Me Daily reviews Episode by Episode

2009 American television series debuts
2010 American television series endings
Food Network original programming
Television shows filmed in New York City
Television shows shot in the Las Vegas Valley
Television shows filmed in Boston
Television shows filmed in California
Television shows filmed in Illinois
Television shows filmed in New Orleans
Television shows filmed in Miami
Television shows filmed in Georgia (U.S. state)
Television shows filmed in Texas
Television shows filmed in Arizona
Television shows filmed in Washington (state)
Television shows filmed in Oregon
Television shows filmed in Pennsylvania
Television shows filmed in Maryland
Television shows filmed in Washington, D.C.